18th & California and 18th & Stout stations (sometimes styled as 18th•California and 18th•Stout) are a pair of is an light rail stations in Downtown Denver, Colorado, United States. It is served by the D, H, and L lines, operated by the Regional Transportation District (RTD), and was opened on October 8, 1994. These stations have one track each, and are one city block apart. 18th & California is served only by northbound trains and 18th & Stout is served only by southbound trains. This is a transfer point for any passenger traveling to stops north of this station along Welton Street towards the 30th & Downing station. The L Line serves these stops.

Gallery

References 

RTD light rail stations in Denver
Railway stations in the United States opened in 1994